Pharmavite is an American dietary supplements company that was founded in 1971 by California pharmacist, Barry Pressman, and that was acquired by Otsuka Pharmaceutical in 1989. Its "Nature Made" vitamin brand was launched the following year.

Pharmavite works with the  United States Pharmacopeia's (USP) Dietary Supplements Verification Program on some of its products.

References

1971 establishments in California
Pharmaceutical companies of the United States
Pharmaceutical companies established in 1971
Dietary supplements
Companies based in California
Otsuka Pharmaceutical
American subsidiaries of foreign companies